Final Destination  is an American horror franchise consisting of five films, ten novels, and two comic books composed of six issues in total. Each medium features a protagonist who experiences a premonition of himself/herself and several others dying in a catastrophic accident, only to escape the event with a handful of other characters moments before it turns into a reality. The survivors later die one by one in a series of elaborate and often gory scenarios that frequently resemble Rube Goldberg machines in their complexity.

Despite depicting homicide, the series is noteworthy amongst others in the horror genre in that the "villain" of the films is not the stereotypical slasher or monster but the entity Death itself (occasionally seen as a fleeting shadow or a gust of wind) which manipulates the environment in deadly ways with the intent of reclaiming the lives of the survivors.

The list of characters includes those who died in the protagonist's initial premonition and those who died among the survivors. Characters are listed in alphabetical order, and are arranged by chronological appearance. Unnecessary characters are excluded, for example, those who do not affect the story heavily. The status of the character indicates whether the character is alive, deceased, or if their fate is unknown.

Final Destination

Alex Browning

 Portrayed by: Devon Sawa
 Appeared in: Final Destination, Final Destination 2, Final Destination 5
 Status: Deceased

Alexander Theodore "Alex" Browning is the protagonist and visionary of Final Destination. He is one of the survivors of Flight 180, and the sixth survivor to die.

Alex is a senior at Mt. Abraham High School who boards Volée Airlines Flight 180 with his classmates for their senior trip to Paris, France. Before take off, Alex has a premonition that a catastrophic mechanical failure will cause the plane to explode in mid-air, killing everyone on board. When the events from his vision begin to repeat themselves, he panics and is thrown off the plane along with six others, who witness the plane explode moments later. Over the next several months, the survivors begin to die one by one in a series of bizarre accidents, and after learning that Death is still after them, Alex attempts to figure out Death's plan and save the remaining survivors. He manages to save Clear Rivers and Carter Horton and Death skips them, leading them to believe they have cheated Death's plan. Six months later, Alex, Clear, and Carter travel to Paris to celebrate their survival. After explaining that Death still hasn't skipped him, Alex is nearly hit by a falling sign but Carter saves him at the last second, and Death skips him. When Carter asks who is next the sign swings back down towards Carter, revealing that Death's plan is still in action. In Final Destination 2 it is revealed that following the events of the first film Alex and Clear cheated Death dozens of times before he was finally bludgeoned by a falling brick.

Alex is mentioned again in Final Destination 3 and seen in archive footage in Final Destination 5.

Barbara Browning
 Portrayed by: Barbara Tyson
 Appeared in: Final Destination
 Status: Alive

Barbara Browning is the mother of Alex Browning and the wife of Ken Browning. Barbara is first seen helping Alex pack his bags before his flight to Paris, and is later seen comforting Alex after the plane explodes.

Billy Hitchcock

 Portrayed by: Seann William Scott
 Appeared in: Final Destination, Final Destination 2, The Final Destination, Final Destination 5
 Status: Deceased

William "Billy" Hitchcock is one of the survivors of Flight 180. He is the fourth survivor to die.

Billy is a student at Mt. Abraham High School, and a main target of Carter Horton's bullying. He was supposed to board Flight 180 with his classmates for their senior trip to Paris, but got stuck in the airport's restroom before the plane's departure. He arrives just as Alex Browning and Carter are being thrown off the plane, and is forced off as well after being caught in the commotion. Moments later, he witnesses the plane explode in mid-air. Thirty-nine days later, he and the other survivors attend a memorial service for the victims. He later encounters the other survivors at a cafe, where he witnesses Terry Chaney's death. After Ms. Valerie Lewton's death, he reunites with the other survivors to discuss what they should do. As they drive through town Carter learns that he is next on Death's list and begins to drive recklessly through the streets. When Carter parks his car on railroad tracks, he becomes trapped, but Alex manages to save him just seconds before his car is smashed by an oncoming train. As Billy warns the others to stay away from Carter, he is suddenly decapitated by flying shrapnel from the car wreckage. As a result, Alex learns that if someone intervenes Death will move on to the next person.

Billy is mentioned again in Final Destination 2 by Officer Thomas Burke, who says he avoided a fatal shootout after being called to clean up Billy's remains. His death is shown again in x-ray format during the opening credits of The Final Destination and again in a montage at the end of Final Destination 5.

Blake Dreyer
 Portrayed by: Christine Chatelain
 Appeared in: Final Destination
 Status: Deceased

Blake Dreyer is a student at Mt. Abraham High School, and a casualty of the explosion of Flight 180.

Blake boards Flight 180 with her best friend Christa Marsh for their senior trip to Paris. Their classmate Tod Waggner had a crush on both of them, and planned to spend the flight trying to hook up with them. Before the planes departure, Alex Browning has a premonition that the plane will explode in mid-air. He awakens as Blake and Christa ask him to switch seats, just like in his premonition, and begins to panic. Disregarding Alex's warning, she stays on the plane and is incinerated among 286 other passengers. Later on, Alex realizes that it is not his turn to die, since he never changed seats with Blake and Christa, like he did in his original premonition.

Carter Horton
 Portrayed by: Kerr Smith
 Appeared in: Final Destination, Final Destination 2, Final Destination 5
 Status: Deceased

Carter Horton is one of the survivors of Flight 180. He is the fifth survivor to die.

Carter is a student at Mt. Abraham High School, and Alex Browning's arch rival. He boards Flight 180 with his girlfriend Terry Chaney for their senior trip to Paris, France. When Alex warns everyone that the plane will explode, Carter believes that he is making it up as a joke and attacks him. As a result, they are both thrown off the plane, along with five others, who witness the plane explode shortly after. Thirty-nine days later, he attends a memorial service for the victims, where he refuses to admit that Alex saved his life. He later confronts Alex at a cafe where they witness Terry's death, leaving Carter devastated. The survivors later reunite and Alex explains that Death is still after them. When Carter learns that he is next on Death's list he goes into a rage and parks his car on railroad tracks, wanting to die on his own terms. He changes his mind at the last minute, but cannot get out when his seat belt jams. Alex manages to save Carter just seconds before his car is smashed by an oncoming train, and Death skips him. Six months later, Carter visits Paris with Alex and Clear Rivers to celebrate their survival. Shortly after Alex explains that Death still hasn't skipped him, Carter saves him from being hit by a large neon sign. When Alex says that Death has now skipped him, Carter asks who is next, and the sign swings back down towards Carter, revealing that once Death has skipped everyone it will go back to the top of the list and start over again.

Carter is mentioned by Rory Peters in Final Destination 2, who says that after witnessing Carter's death he decided not to attend a theater, which later collapsed on the guests. He is seen again via archive footage in Final Destination 5.

Christa Marsh
 Portrayed by: Lisa Marie Caruk
 Appeared in: Final Destination
 Status: Deceased

Christa Marsh is a student at Mt. Abraham High School, and a casualty of the explosion of Flight 180.

Christa boards Flight 180 with her best friend Blake Dreyer for their senior trip to Paris. Their classmate Tod Waggner had a crush on both of them, and planned to spend the flight trying to hook up with them. Before the plane's departure, Alex Browning has a vision that the plane will explode in mid-air. He awakens just as Christa asks him to change seats, just like in his vision, and begins to panic. Disregarding Alex's warning, she stays on the plane and is incinerated among 286 other passengers. Later, Alex realizes that it is not his turn to die, since he never changed seats with Blake and Christa, like he did in his original premonition.

Clear Rivers

 Portrayed by: Ali Larter
 Appeared in: Final Destination, Final Destination 2, The Final Destination, Final Destination 5
 Status: Deceased

Clear Marie Rivers is a character that appeared in both Final Destination and Final Destination 2. She is the seventh and final survivor of Flight 180 to die.

Clear is a student who boards Flight 180 for her senior trip to Paris. When Alex Browning warns everyone that the plane will explode, Clear is the only one who believes him, and she leaves the plane along with six others, who witness the plane explode shortly after. Thirty-nine days later, she attends the memorial service for the victims; she is the only one who thanks Alex for saving her, and gives him a rose to show her gratitude. After Tod Waggner's death, she and Alex sneak into the morgue to see his body. There they encounter William Bludworth, who warns them that Death is still after the survivors. Clear is initially skeptical, until the other survivors start to die one by one. After saving Carter Horton, Alex distances himself from the group, believing that he is next on Death's list. He later learns that Clear is actually next, and rushes to her house to save her. Meanwhile, Clear is trapped inside her car, which is leaking gas fluid, and is surrounded by live wires. Alex arrives in time to save Clear, and grabs the wire allowing her to escape from the car seconds before it explodes, and Death skips her. Six months later, Clear, Alex, and Carter travel to Paris, to celebrate their survival; however, after Alex narrowly avoids Death, they both witness Carter's death and realize that Death's plan is still in action.

In Final Destination 2, it is revealed that Clear is the last survivor of Flight 180, and has committed herself to a mental institution to protect herself from Death. She is visited by Kimberly Corman, who asks her to help her save the survivors of the Route 23 pile-up. She initially refuses, but later introduces Kimberly and Officer Thomas Burke to Bludworth, who tells them that only "new life" can defeat Death. This leads them to believe that if Isabella Hudson has her baby it will ruin Death's plan, and they will all be safe. She, Kimberly, and Officer Burke manage to save Isabella and her baby, but Kimberly later realizes that Isabella was never meant to die in the pile-up, and was therefore never on Death's list. Clear searches for Eugene Dix at the hospital, but accidentally causes his room to explode from an oxygen combustion, killing them both.

Clear's death is shown again in x-ray format during the opening credits of The Final Destination and seen again in a montage at the end of Final Destination 5.

George Waggner
 Portrayed by: Brendan Fehr
 Appeared in: Final Destination, Final Destination 5
 Status: Deceased

George Waggner is the brother of Tod Waggner, and a casualty of the Flight 180 explosion.

George and Tod board Flight 180 for their field trip to Paris, with their best friend Alex Browning. George later instructs Tod to go check on Alex after he is thrown off the plane, and the plane explodes shortly after, incinerating George and 286 other passengers. His death infuriates the Waggner household, who blame Alex for his death.

Ken Browning
 Portrayed by: Robert Wisden
 Appeared in: Final Destination
 Status: Alive

Kenneth "Ken" Browning is the father of Alex Browning and the husband of Barbara Browning. Ken is first seen talking to Alex while he and his mother pack his bags for his flight to Paris, and is later seen comforting Alex after the plane explodes. He expresses his concern for Alex when he refuses to speak to him or his mother about what is going on.

Larry Murnau
 Portrayed by: Forbes Angus
 Appeared in: Final Destination, Final Destination 5
 Status: Deceased

Laurent "Larry" Murnau is a French teacher at Mt. Abraham High School, and a casualty of the Flight 180 explosion. He was in charge of chaperoning the students on their trip to Paris.

Mr. Murnau is very fluent in the French language, which is why he was selected to guide the students on their field trip to Paris. After several students are removed from the plane, Ms. Valerie Lewton volunteers to stay behind and look after the students until the next flight, and sends Mr. Murnau back on the plane. The plane explodes shortly after, and he is incinerated among 286 others. His death affected Ms. Lewton the most, who became guilt-ridden, holding herself personally responsible for his death.

Mr. Murnau is briefly seen via archive footage in Final Destination 5.

Agent Schreck
 Portrayed by: Roger Guenveur Smith
 Appeared in: Final Destination
 Status: Alive

Special Agent Schreck is an FBI agent. He is the partner of Agent Weine.

He and Agent Weine interrogate the survivors, following the explosion of Flight 180, and become suspicious of Alex Browning. They keep a close eye on Alex, and their suspicion grows even more when the survivors begin to die one by one. At the end, he and Agent Weine attempt to arrest Alex and chase him into the woods, but after they witness him rescue Clear Rivers, Alex is cleared of suspicion.

Terry Chaney
 Portrayed by: Amanda Detmer
 Appeared in: Final Destination, Final Destination 2, Final Destination 5
 Status: Deceased

Theresa "Terry" Chaney is one of the survivors of Flight 180. She is the second survivor to die.

Terry is a student at Mt. Abraham High School, and the girlfriend of Carter Horton. She boards Flight 180 with Carter for their senior trip to Paris, but when Alex Browning warns everyone that the plane will explode, Carter attacks him, and is thrown off the plane. Terry follows him off as well, and witnesses the plane explode shortly after. Following the accident, Terry is ignored by Carter, who seems more interested in starting fights with Alex. While driving past a cafe, Carter sees Alex and instigates another fight. After berating Carter, Terry storms off in anger, and is suddenly hit by a speeding bus.

Terry is mentioned in Final Destination 2 by Kat Jennings, who says that she was on her way to a bed and breakfast when the bus she was riding hit Terry. As a result, she avoided a gas leak that suffocated the guests staying at the lodge. Terry's death is referenced during the opening credits of The Final Destination, and she is seen again via archive footage in Final Destination 5.

Tod Waggner
 Portrayed by: Chad Donella
 Appeared in: Final Destination, Final Destination 2, The Final Destination
 Status: Deceased

Tod Waggner is one of the survivors of Flight 180. He is the first survivor to die.

Tod is a student at Mt. Abraham High School, and Alex Browning's best friend. He boards Flight 180 with Alex and his brother George for their senior trip to Paris. When Alex has a premonition that the plane will explode, George instructs Tod to go check on him, and Tod witnesses the plane explode shortly after. Tod's parents blame Alex for George's death, and his friendship with Alex becomes distant. Tod later delivers a farewell speech at the memorial service. That night, while Tod is in his bathroom the toilet begins to leak, causing him to slip and fall into the bathtub. The clothes line wraps around Tod's neck and slowly suffocates him as he desperately attempts to free himself, but he eventually dies from asphyxia. His death is deemed a suicide; however, Alex does not believe that Tod killed himself.

Tod is mentioned by Kimberly Corman in Final Destination 2, who says that while shopping with her mother, she was distracted by a news piece on Tod's death, and was therefore not targeted by the car thieves who killed her mother. Tod's death is seen again in x-ray format during the opening credits of The Final Destination.

Valerie Lewton
 Portrayed by: Kristen Cloke
 Appeared in: Final Destination, Final Destination 2, The Final Destination, Final Destination 5
 Status: Deceased

Valerie "Val" Lewton, or Ms. Lewton, is one of the survivors of Flight 180. She is the third survivor to die.

Ms. Lewton is a teacher at Mt. Abraham High School who is chosen to chaperone the students on their field trip to Paris. After a handful of students are thrown off the plane, Ms. Lewton volunteers to stay behind and watch them, convincing Mr. Larry Murnau to get back on the plane. After the plane explodes, Ms. Lewton shows extreme guilt for inadvertently causing Mr. Murnau's death; at the same time, she becomes distrustful and terrified of Alex Browning because of his premonition coming true. She ultimately decides to leave town in order to restart her life. While packing her things, she makes coffee, but after being startled and throwing the coffee out of the mug, she puts vodka and ice into the same mug. The sudden cooling causes a crack to form in the mug, and the contents leak out all over the floor and into a computer monitor, causing a short circuit. The computer explodes and shrapnel is sent flying into her neck. The sparks from the explosion ignite the trail of vodka, which leads to a bottle sitting on top of the counter. The bottle explodes, causing the counter to catch fire, and Ms. Lewton falls to the floor. She reaches for a rag sitting on top of a rack of knives on the counter, but it falls over and one of the knives impales her in the chest. Alex arrives to save her, but the oven explodes, causing a chair to fall on top of her. This pushes the knife even further into her chest and kills her instantly. The fire eventually spreads and causes an explosion which destroys her whole house, as Alex flees the scene.

Ms. Lewton is mentioned in Final Destination 2 by Eugene Dix, who says that he was substituting for Ms. Lewton after her death, when a homicidal student from his previous job killed his substitute. Her death is shown in x-ray format during the opening credits of The Final Destination and she appears again via archive footage in Final Destination 5.

Agent Weine
 Portrayed by: Daniel Roebuck
 Appeared in: Final Destination
 Status: Alive

Special Agent Weine is an FBI agent. He is the partner of Agent Schreck.

He and Agent Schreck interrogate the survivors, following the explosion of Flight 180, and become suspicious of Alex Browning. They keep a close eye on Alex, and their suspicion grows when the survivors began to die one by one. At the end, he and Agent Schreck attempt to arrest Alex and chase him into the woods, but after they witness Alex rescue Clear Rivers, Alex is cleared of suspicion.

William Bludworth

 Portrayed by: Tony Todd
 Appeared in: Final Destination, Final Destination 2, Final Destination 5
 Status: Alive

William "Bill" Bludworth is a mysterious mortician who appears in Final Destination, Final Destination 2, and Final Destination 5.

Bludworth has the most knowledge of Death, although it is unclear how. In Final Destination, Alex Browning and Clear Rivers sneak inside Bludworth's morgue to see Tod Waggner's corpse. After Bludworth catches them he explains that they have ruined Death's plan, and Death is now claiming the lives of those who were meant to die on the plane, unless they can find a way to cheat Death's plan. In Final Destination 2, Bludworth is visited by Clear, Kimberly Corman, and Thomas Burke, to acquire more knowledge, and explains that only "new life" can defeat Death, leading the three to believe that if Isabella Hudson has her baby it will interfere with Death's list and they will all be safe. In Final Destination 5, Bludworth ominously watches the survivors of the North Bay bridge collapse. When confronted by Sam Lawton, Molly Harper, Peter Friedkin, and Nathan Sears, he warns them about Death and tells them that by killing someone else they can acquire that person's remaining lifespan.

Final Destination 2

Brian Gibbons
 Portrayed by: Noel Fisher
 Appeared in: Final Destination 2
 Status: Deceased

Brian Gibbons is a teenage farmer. Although he is originally not on Death's list, Brian's death is prevented by Rory Peters, and he is added to the list.

Brian was the son of a farmer, who lived near the 180 Mile Marker of Greenwood Lake, New York. After the Route 23 survivors' SUV crashes onto their farm, Brian and his family try to help them out. Rory pulls Brian out of the path of a speeding news van at the last second, and he is unknowingly added to Death's list. Some time later, during a picnic with his parents, Kimberly Corman, Michael Corman, and Thomas Burke, the propane tank of his barbecue grill erupts, blowing Brian to pieces, and his arm lands on his mother's plate as she screams in horror.

Dano Estevez
 Portrayed by: Alejandro Rae
 Appeared in: Final Destination 2, Final Destination 5
 Status: Deceased

Daniel "Dano" Estevez is a college student from White Plains, New York and one of the casualties of the Route 23 pile-up.

In the film, Dano, Frankie Whitman, Shaina McKlank, and Kimberly Corman go on a road trip to Daytona Beach for spring break. En route, Kimberly has a premonition of a massive pile-up, in which a semi-truck smashes into her SUV, killing all four of them. As a result, Kimberly stalls her SUV to prevent other drivers from entering the freeway. After Officer Thomas Burke tells Kimberly to exit the car, Dano, Shaina, and Frankie are killed by the same truck from Kimberly's premonition.

His death is referenced in the opening credits of The Final Destination and seen again in a montage at the end of Final Destination 5.

Ellen Kalarjian
 Portrayed by: Enid-Raye Adams
 Appeared in: Final Destination 2
 Status: Alive

Dr. Ellen Kalarjian is a physician.

Dr. Kalarjian works at the Lakeview Hospital in Greenwood Lake, New York. In the film, Kimberly has a premonition of what she believes is Dr. Kalarjian "strangling" Isabella Hudson during child labor. At the hospital, she is requested by Isabella's obstetrician and Officer Thomas Burke immobilizes her as Isabella gives birth. Soon after, Eugene Dix's room blows up, prompting her to bring a crash cart to the victims. Moments later, she resuscitates Kimberly Corman from drowning in Greenwood Lake, which turns out to be Kimberly's actual premonition regarding "new life".

Eugene Dix
 Portrayed by: Terrence C. Carson
 Appeared in: Final Destination 2, Final Destination 5
 Status: Deceased

Eugene Dix is one of the survivors of the Route 23 pile-up. He is the sixth survivor to die.

Eugene is a high school teacher. Prior to the crash, he was substituting for Ms. Valerie Lewton at Mt. Abraham High School, and one of the students from his old school stabbed his substitute teacher during class. In the film, Kimberly Corman has a premonition of a pile-up on Route 23, in which Eugene's motorcycle crushes his torso after he skids across the road. Although he is initially skeptical that Death is still after the survivors, he meets up with the other survivors at Officer Thomas Burke's apartment, where he witnesses Nora Carpenter's death. A horrified Eugene takes Burke's gun and attempts suicide, wanting to die on his own terms, but this fails despite the fact the gun was fully loaded. Clear Rivers explains that this is because it wasn't his turn to die yet. Afterwards, the remaining survivors leave to find Isabella Hudson. On the way there, Kat Jennings' SUV nearly collides with Isabella's van and they swerve onto a nearby farm. Several PVC pipes penetrate the car, and puncture Eugene's lung and he is quickly rushed to the hospital in an ambulance. Numbed by hypoxia he helplessly watches as the vents close, the tubes of his oxygen tanks snap, and the power plug of his defibrillator disengages. The machine's emergency mode activates and revives him, but Clear abruptly opens his door which completely detaches the plug, creating a spark that ignites the oxygen and incinerates them both.

Eugene's death is referenced in the opening credits of The Final Destination and he is seen again in a montage at the end of Final Destination 5.

Evan Lewis
 Portrayed by: David Paetkau
 Appeared in: Final Destination 2, The Final Destination, Final Destination 5
 Status: Deceased

Evan Lewis is one of the survivors of the Route 23 pile-up. He is the first survivor to die.

Evan is a recent lottery winner. In the film, Kimberly Corman has a premonition in which Evan's new car crashes into a log truck's oil tank, engulfing him in flames until a semi-trailer truck runs him over. After she prevents him from entering the highway, he is brought to the police station for questioning, and interrogated by Detective Suby. After being released he returns to his apartment, where he heats up some noodles in the microwave, unaware that a refrigerator magnet has fallen in the box, while he fries mozzarella sticks on the stove. While trying on his new jewelry, his microwave begins to spark, startling him and causing him to drop his new ring down the sink. When he reaches into the drain to retrieve it, his watch causes his hand to get stuck. When the stove starts to flare, he attempts to put out the fire with his shirt, but inadvertently causes the pan to fall over, setting the entire apartment on fire. When he finally frees his hand he tries to put out the fire with a fire extinguisher, but it stalls. Desperate, Evan smashes the windows, and escapes seconds before his kitchen explodes. Evan climbs down the escape ladder, but as he walks away he slips on old spaghetti (which he threw out the window moments earlier), and the ladder falls, impaling his right eye. This alarms the other survivors, who watch news coverage of his death.

Evan's death is seen in x-ray format during the opening credits of The Final Destination, and again in a montage at the end of  Final Destination 5.

Frankie Whitman
 Portrayed by: Shaun Sipos
 Appeared in: Final Destination 2, Final Destination 5
 Status: Deceased

Franklin "Frankie" Whitman is a college student from White Plains, New York and one of the casualties of the Route 23 pile-up.

In the film, Frankie, Dano Estevez, Shaina McKlank, and Kimberly Corman go on a road trip to Daytona Beach, Florida for spring break. En route, Kimberly has a premonition of a massive pile-up, in which a semi-truck smashes into her SUV, killing all four of them. As a result, Kimberly stalls her SUV to prevent other drivers from entering the freeway. After Officer Thomas Burke asks Kimberly to exit the vehicle, Frankie, Dano, and Shaina are killed by the same truck from Kimberly's vision.

His death is referenced in the opening credits of The Final Destination, and he is seen again in a montage at the end of Final Destination 5.

Isabella Hudson
 Portrayed by: Justina Machado
 Appeared in: Final Destination 2
 Status: Alive

Isabella Hudson is a survivor of the Route 23 pile-up in Final Destination 2.

Isabella lives in New York City with her husband Marcus Hudson, and is nine months pregnant with a baby boy. In the film, Kimberly Corman blocks the entrance ramp, preventing Isabella from entering the highway before a major pile-up occurs. When Kimberly discovers that Death is still after the survivors she learns that "new life" can break the chain, and Isabella is incarcerated by Deputy Steve Adams under Officer Thomas Burke's orders to protect her from Death. While in jail her water breaks and Deputy Adams rushes her to the hospital. On the road, Kat Jennings' SUV almost collides with Isabella's van; nonetheless, she arrives at the hospital unharmed. At the hospital, Kimberly has another vision of what appears to be Isabella's physician, Dr. Ellen Kalarjian, "strangling" Isabella. Burke stops Dr. Kalarjian from disrupting her pregnancy, and she successfully delivers her son, which leads them to believe that they have cheated Death, however, Kimberly later realizes that Isabella was never meant to die in the pile-up, and was therefore not on Death's list, making their efforts futile.

Kat Jennings

 Portrayed by: Keegan Connor Tracy
 Appeared in: Final Destination 2, The Final Destination, Final Destination 5
 Status: Deceased

Katherine "Kat" Jennings is one of the survivors of the Route 23 pile-up. She is the fourth survivor to die.

Kat is a successful marketing consultant for a business firm. Prior to the film, she was scheduled for a client meeting at a local bed-and-breakfast, but the bus she was on hit Terry Chaney, and she avoided a gas leak that killed everyone in the lodge. In the film, Kimberly Corman has a premonition of a massive pile-up, in which Kat's SUV flips upside down, crushing her. After Kimberly prevents Kat from entering the highway, she is brought to the police station for questioning. She initially disregards Kimberly's theory that Death may still be after the survivors. Nonetheless, she attends a meeting for the survivors at Officer Thomas Burke's apartment, where she and Clear Rivers attempt to save Nora Carpenter from death, but are unable to. On their way to the Lakeview Hospital, Kat's SUV suffers a blow out. She nearly collides with Isabella Hudson's van, and swerves onto a nearby farm, where her SUV is penetrated by PVC pipes. She is trapped in her seat by a log, and a rescuer attempts to free her with the Jaws of Life, but this inadvertently triggers her airbag, which pushes her head into a pipe protruding from her headrest.

Kat's death is seen in x-ray format during the opening credits of The Final Destination, although the pipe is shown going her head diagonally rather than going straight through her forehead. She is seen again in a montage at the end of Final Destination 5.

Kimberly Corman

 Portrayed by: A. J. Cook
 Appeared in: Final Destination 2, Final Destination 3
 Status: Alive

Kimberly "Kim" Corman is the protagonist and visionary of Final Destination 2. She is one of the survivors of the Route 23 pile-up.

Kimberly is a college student from White Plains, New York, who was planning on visiting Daytona Beach, Florida for spring break with her friends Shaina McKlank, Dano Estevez, and Frankie Whitman. A year prior, she was supposed to have been killed in a mugging that took her mom's life, but was distracted by a news report about Tod's 'suicide'. After stopping on the on-ramp to Route 23, Kimberly has a premonition of a pile-up in which several people, including her and her friends, are killed. She stalls her vehicle preventing those who would have died from entering the freeway, but her friends are killed moments later by a speeding semi-trailer truck. She and the other survivors are later brought to the police station, where she and Eugene Dix explain the similarities between their experience and the survivors of Flight 180. When Evan Lewis dies, Kimberly seeks the help of Flight 180 survivor Clear Rivers, who initially refuses, but later brings her and Officer Thomas Burke to William Bludworth. He tells them that only "new life" can defeat Death, leading them to believe that if Isabella Hudson has her baby it will ruin Death's plan and they will all be safe. Although the other survivors meet their demise, Kimberly, Clear, and Burke manage to save Isabella and her infant son. Upon realizing that Isabella was never on Death's list, Kimberly attempts to sacrifice herself by driving a van into a lake, but she is rescued by Burke and resuscitated by Dr. Ellen Kalarjian, thus granting her "new life".

In Final Destination 3, a newspaper article reveals that Kimberly and Burke were killed after being knocked into a wood chipper at a hardware store; however, this is only mentioned in an alternate ending, making it non-canon.

Michael Corman
 Portrayed by: Andrew Airlie
 Appeared in: Final Destination 2
 Status: Alive

Michael Corman is the father of Kimberly Corman.

Michael and Kimberly have become very close after her mother's death. In the film, he sends Kimberly off on her vacation with her friend Shaina McKlank. He is later seen comforting Kimberly at the police station after the accident, and she confides in him her fear that Death might still be after the survivors. He later accompanies Kimberly and Officer Thomas Burke to a picnic with the Gibbons family, where they witness Brian Gibbons' death.

Nora Carpenter
 Portrayed by: Lynda Boyd
 Appeared in: Final Destination 2, The Final Destination, Final Destination 5
 Status: Deceased

Nora Carpenter is one of the survivors of the Route 23 pile-up. She is the third survivor to die.

Nora is a widow who lives with her teenage son Tim Carpenter, after her husband died four years earlier. In the film, Kimberly Corman has a premonition of a massive pile-up on Route 23. In her premonition Nora's car crashes into a log, killing both her and Tim. After Kimberly prevents them from entering the highway, she and the other survivors are brought to the police station for questioning. There, Kimberly tries to warn the survivors that Death may still be after them, but Nora dismisses her theory and leaves. The next day, Tim is killed while leaving the dentist, leaving Nora devastated. She later attends a meeting for the survivors at Officer Thomas Burke's apartment, but leaves early to plan her son's funeral. While inside an elevator with Eugene Dix, she gets a call from Burke, who warns her about a man with hooks. Moments later, her hair gets entangled by a man standing behind her holding prosthetic limbs with hooks and her neck is trapped between the elevator doors as she tries to escape; the elevator then starts to move. Clear Rivers and Kat Jennings try to help her, but the elevator continues to rise until she is decapitated by the force, to the horror of Eugene and the man who had been carrying the hooks.

Nora's death is referenced in the opening credits of The Final Destination and is seen again in a montage at the end of Final Destination 5.

Rory Peters
 Portrayed by: Jonathan Cherry
 Appeared in: Final Destination 2, The Final Destination, Final Destination 5
 Status: Deceased

Rory Peters is one of the survivors of the Route 23 pile-up. He is the fifth survivor to die.

Rory is a heavy drug user. Prior to the film, he traveled to Paris, where he witnessed Carter Horton's death outside a cafe. Horrified by what he had seen, he decided to go home instead of attending a theater that later collapsed on the guests. In the film, Kimberly Corman has a premonition of a massive pile-up on Route 23, in which a garbage truck crashes into Rory's car. After Kimberly prevents Rory from entering the highway, he and the other survivors are brought to the police station for questioning. While there, Kimberly tries to warn them that Death may still be after the survivors, but Rory doesn't take her seriously. Nonetheless, he attends a group meeting at Officer Thomas Burke's apartment where he tries to stop a traumatized Eugene Dix from committing suicide. When the group leaves to find Isabella Hudson in Kat Jennings' SUV, the vehicle swerves onto a nearby farm, and the car is penetrated by PVC pipes. While there, Rory pulls Brian Gibbons out of the path of a speeding news van, unintentionally adding him to Death's list. He later asks Kimberly to hide his addictions from his mother if he dies. After Kat is killed, she drops a cigarette into a fuel leakage from the news van, and the van explodes, sending a barbed wire fence flying through the air, which trisects Rory.

Rory's death is seen in x-ray format in the opening credits of The Final Destination, and he is seen again in a montage at the end of Final Destination 5.

Shaina McKlank
 Portrayed by: Sarah Carter
 Appeared in: Final Destination 2, Final Destination 5
 Status: Deceased

Shaina McKlank is a college student from White Plains, New York and one of the casualties of the Route 23 pile-up.
In the film, Shaina, along with Dano Estevez, Frankie Whitman, and Kimberly Corman go on a road trip to Daytona Beach for spring break. En route, Kimberly has a premonition of a pile-up on Route 23 in which her SUV is smashed by a semi-truck, killing all four of them. As a result, Kimberly stalls her SUV to prevent other drivers from entering the freeway. After Officer Thomas Burke tells Kimberly to exit the car, Shaina, Dano, and Frankie are killed by the same truck from Kimberly's premonition.

Her death is referenced in the opening credits of The Final Destination, and she is seen again in a montage at the end of Final Destination 5.

Thomas Burke
 Portrayed by: Michael Landes
 Appeared in: Final Destination 2, Final Destination 3, Final Destination 5
 Status: Alive

Officer Thomas Burke is one of the survivors of the Route 23 pile-up.

Burke is a highway patrol officer stationed in Westchester County, and also performs secondary tasks such as police investigation and crime scene cleanup. A year prior to the Route 23 pile-up he was ordered to clean up the remains of Billy Hitchcock, and therefore avoided a shootout that took the life of his partner. In the film, Kimberly Corman has a premonition of a pile-up, in which a log crashes through Burke's windshield obliterating his head. Kimberly prevents him and several others from entering the highway, and the survivors are brought to the police station for questioning. Burke is the only one to consider Kimberly's theory that Death may still after them. After Evan Lewis' death, he and Kimberly attempt to save the remaining survivors, with the help of Flight 180 survivor Clear Rivers. She brings them to William Bludworth, who asserts that only "new life" can defeat Death. This leads them to believe that if Isabella Hudson has her baby it will ruin Death's plan, and they will all be safe. Burke falsely accuses Isabella of grand theft auto, and she is incarcerated. After the death of several other survivors, Isabella goes into labor, and Burke, Kimberly, and Clear rush to the hospital, where they witness Isabella give birth. They believe they have finally cheated Death until Kimberly realizes that Isabella was never on Death's list. Kimberly sacrifices herself for Burke's sake, and after he saves her, she is resuscitated by Dr. Ellen Kalarjian, thus granting her "new life". Since Kimberly died out of order, Death's list is ruined, saving Burke as well.

In Final Destination 3, a newspaper article reveals that Burke and Kimberly were killed after being knocked into a woodchipper at a hardware store; however, this is only mentioned in an alternate ending, making it non-canon. Officer Burke is seen again in a montage at the end of Final Destination 5.

Tim Carpenter
 Portrayed by: James Kirk
 Appeared in: Final Destination 2, Final Destination 5
 Status: Deceased

Timothy "Tim" Carpenter is one of the survivors of the Route 23 pile-up. He is the second survivor to die.

Tim is a 15-year-old boy who lives with his mother Nora Carpenter ever since his father died four years earlier. In the film, Kimberly Corman has a premonition in which Nora's car crashes into a log that has fallen from a truck, killing them both. Kimberly stalls her car on the entrance ramp, preventing them from entering the highway, and he and the other survivors are later brought to the police station for questioning. While there, Kimberly warns them that Death may still be after them, but he and Nora ignore her warning and leave. The next day, he and his mother go to his dentist appointment. While there, he is infused with laughing gas and the dentist leaves due to an emergency. He is numb and unable to move when a plastic blowfish from a hanging mobile falls into his mouth, and nearly chokes him to death, but another dentist enters the room and removes it before that can happen. As he and Nora leave the clinic, Kimberly and Officer Thomas Burke warn them about pigeons, and Tim scares several pigeons near a pavement away for fun. One of these pigeons blinds a construction worker in a crane, who accidentally hits a switch that drops a glass pane above Tim, crushing him.

Tim is seen again in a montage at the end of Final Destination 5.

Final Destination 3

Amber Regan
 Portrayed by: Ecstasia Sanders
 Appeared in: Final Destination 3
 Status: Alive

Amber Regan is a friend of Julie Christensen and Perry Malinowski.

Amber visits the amusement park for McKinley High School's grad night with Julie and Perry. Unlike Julie and Perry, she does not board the Devil's Flight roller coaster and is thus spared from the collision. Amber and her friends later visit the Tricentennial Fair, where she witnesses Julie almost die from being impaled by a harrow, and Perry being impaled by a flagpole moments later. Horrified by Perry's death, she quickly leaves the fair.

Ashley Freund and Ashlyn Halperin
 Portrayed by: Chelan Simmons and Crystal Lowe
 Appeared in: Final Destination 3, The Final Destination, Final Destination 5
 Status: Both Deceased

Ashley Freund and Ashlyn Halperin are survivors of the Devil's Flight roller coaster. They are the first and second survivors to die.

Ashley and Ashlyn are two ditzy best friends who visit the amusement park for McKinley High School's grad night. They board the Devil's Flight roller coaster, but before the ride starts Wendy Christensen has a premonition that the ride will crash. In Wendy's premonition, Ashley and Ashlyn fall to their deaths with Carrie Dreyer and Jason Wise when the front cars derail. When Wendy panics, a fight breaks out, and they leave in annoyance, moments before the ride crashes as Wendy predicted. The next day, in preparation for graduation, they decide to go to a tanning salon. Ashley enters the room with Ashlyn, ignoring the worker when he tells her to throw out her slushie, and sets it on a table above the power supply unit. Ashlyn turns up the air conditioner, while Ashley browses through CDs on a shelf, accidentally pulling the shelf loose. As they lie in the tanning beds, condensation from Ashley's slushie begins to drip onto the power supply unit, causing it to malfunction. The air conditioner causes a coat rack to fall against a plant, which falls and knocks down the shelf. When Ashley and Ashlyn emerge from the tanning beds, the shelf slides into the openings, trapping them. As the temperature rises, they scream for help and attempt to escape, but the beds overheat and burst into flames, burning them both alive.

Ashley and Ashlyn's deaths are seen again in x-ray format during the opening credits of The Final Destination, and again in a montage at the end of Final Destination 5.

In an alternate version of Final Destination 3, Ashlyn gets out from the tanning bed before the shelf traps her and Ashley, however she is knocked out by the shelf. She later wakes up to Ashley's screams and manages to open her tanning bed, but is electrocuted along with Ashley when she tries to save the latter from the other tanning bed.

Carrie Dreyer
 Portrayed by: Gina Holden
 Appeared in: Final Destination 3
 Status: Deceased

Carrie Dreyer is the best friend of Wendy Christensen and the girlfriend of Kevin Fischer. She is a casualty in the Devil's Flight roller coaster derailment.

Carrie is a senior at McKinley High School and about to go to University of California, Berkeley. She attends grad night at the amusement park with her boyfriend Kevin, best friend Wendy, and Wendy's boyfriend Jason Wise. The boys initially had her sit in the back with Wendy, who did not want to see the tracks, but Carrie insists on sitting in the front and switches seats with Kevin. When Wendy has a premonition that the Devil's Flight roller coaster will crash, she panics and is let off the ride, along with several others. The remaining passengers begin to shout, forcing the operators to start the ride, which crashes shortly after as Wendy predicted, and she is the first to fall off the ride before Jason and the others. Kevin is devastated over Carrie's death and later reveals to Wendy that he planned to propose to her after graduation; ironically, Carrie had earlier disclosed to Wendy that she planned on breaking up with Kevin after graduation.

In an alternate version of Final Destination 3, Carrie survives the derailment after Wendy's alternate premonition. She break up with Kevin the day after the incident. After one semester in college, she then travels the world and becomes a groupie for Doctors Without Borders.

Erin Ulmer
 Portrayed by: Alexz Johnson
 Appeared in: Final Destination 3, The Final Destination, Final Destination 5
 Status: Deceased

Erin Ulmer is one of the survivors of the Devil's Flight roller coaster. She is the fifth survivor to die.

Erin is a goth who attends McKinley High School. She visits the amusement park for grad night with her boyfriend Ian McKinley, and they board the Devil's Flight roller coaster together. Before the ride starts Wendy Christensen has a premonition that the roller coaster will crash. In Wendy's premonition, both Erin and Ian fall to their deaths after the ride gets stuck on a vertical loop. When Wendy panics, a fight breaks out between Kevin Fischer and Lewis Romero, and Lewis accidentally slaps Erin, causing Ian to get involved and they are both thrown off the ride, which crashes moments later as Wendy predicted. When the survivors begin to die, Wendy and Kevin go to the hardware store where Erin and Ian work to warn them, but they are skeptical and sarcastic. Unbeknownst to them, a stack of supplies falls on to the gear shift of a forklift, which begins to follow them. The forklift punctures a shelf of supplies, causing several large planks of wood to fall. Wendy and Kevin manage to save Ian before he is impaled, but a large wooden tile falls onto another plank, which is sent flying through the air, and punctures a bag of saw dust, blinding Erin. She falls back onto a nail gun that shoots several nails into her head, killing her. This infuriates Ian, who blames Wendy for Erin's death.

Erin's death is seen in x-ray format during the opening credits of The Final Destination, and again in a montage at the end of Final Destination 5.

In an alternate version of Final Destination 3, her death is the same except that because Ian fired a warning shot, the pigeons fly over Erin instead of the saw dust.

Frankie Cheeks
 Portrayed by: Sam Easton
 Appeared in: Final Destination 3, Final Destination 5
 Status: Deceased

Franklin "Frankie" Cheeks is one of the survivors of the Devil's Flight roller coaster. He is the third survivor to die.

Frankie is a perverted alumnus of McKinley High School. Despite having already graduated two years prior, he attends McKinley's grad night at the amusement park where he continues to harass Ashley Freund and Ashlyn Halperin and follows them onto the Devil's Flight roller coaster. Before the ride starts, Wendy Christensen has a premonition that it will crash, and in Wendy's premonition, Frankie falls to his death when the front cars derail. When she panics, a fight breaks out, and Frankie follows Ashley and Ashlyn off the ride, which crashes shortly after. Wendy and Kevin Fischer later stop at a local drive-through, where a beer truck rams into the side of Kevin's truck, trapping them. As they attempt to escape, a moving truck (without its driver) rolls down a hill towards them. Kevin attempts to get the driver in front of them to move but is rebuffed. Wendy gets the couple behind them to back up, but the truck is already too close, and Kevin is forced to break the windshield. He escapes with Wendy seconds before the truck crashes into Kevin's truck, discharging a motor fan that is hurled towards the driver in front of them, slicing off the back of his head. A minute later, they see that the driver in front of them was Frankie.

Frankie's death is referenced during the opening credits of The Final Destination and is seen again in a montage at the end of Final Destination 5.

In an alternate version of Final Destination 3, Kevin saves Frankie from the engine fan. Frankie plans to use the insurance money from both trucks' drivers on prostitutes instead of buying a new car to replace his wrecked one. However, Frankie is arrested days later by an undercover police officer who was disguised as a prostitute to bait sex offenders, leading to a question appeared on screen asking the audience whether Frankie should have left to die instead.

Ian McKinley
 Portrayed by: Kris Lemche
 Appeared in: Final Destination 3, Final Destination 5
 Status: Deceased

Ian McKinley is one of the survivors of the Devil's Flight roller coaster. He is the seventh survivor to die.

Ian is a goth who attends McKinley High School. He visits the amusement park for grad night with his girlfriend Erin Ulmer, and they board the Devil's Flight roller coaster together. Before the ride starts, Wendy Christensen has a premonition that the ride will crash. In Wendy's premonition, Ian and Erin fall to their deaths when the ride gets stuck upside down. She panics, causing a fight to break out between Kevin Fischer and Lewis Romero. Ian gets involved when Lewis accidentally slaps Erin, and they are both thrown off the ride, which crashes moments later. When the survivors begin to die, Wendy and Kevin go to the hardware store where Ian and Erin work to warn them that they are next on Death's list. They are skeptical and sarcastic, until several large planks of wood fall and almost impale Ian. Wendy manages to save him at the last minute, so Death skips him, and Erin is killed instead. This leaves Ian devastated and causes him to resent Wendy, even though he was responsible for loading the nail gun that killed Erin. Ian later confronts Wendy at the town's Tricentennial Fair, now deranged and blames her for making them being targeted including Erin. Seeing Wendy's fear, Ian believes that Death has a design for him in her demise, and is determined to fulfill his role and see that she would not survive. A cart of fireworks go off in their direction and barely miss Wendy, striking a nearby cherry picker instead. As Ian shouts that Death cannot kill him, the cherry picker collapses on Ian, bisecting him. In an alternate version of the scene, the cherry picker collapses right on Ian, leaving nothing left of him.

Ian's death is referenced in the opening credits of The Final Destination, and is seen again in a montage at the end of Final Destination 5.

Jason Wise
 Portrayed by: Jesse Moss
 Appeared in: Final Destination 3
 Status: Deceased

Jason Robert Wise is Wendy Christensen's boyfriend and a casualty in the Devil's Flight roller coaster derailment.

Jason is a senior at McKinley High School who visits the amusement park for grad night with Wendy, his best friend Kevin Fischer, and Kevin's girlfriend Carrie Dreyer. When Wendy has a premonition that the Devil's Flight roller coaster will crash, she panics and is let off the ride. Jason demands to be let off as well, but is unable to get the operators' attention due to the other passengers shouting over him, demanding that they start the ride. While being escorted off the ride by security guards, Wendy realizes that Jason is still on the roller coaster, runs back, and begs the operator to stop the ride, but she is tackled by the guards and taken outside. Wendy witnesses the roller coaster derail shortly after, and Jason falls to his death after Carrie, leaving Wendy devastated. Later on, the first realization that the photographs Wendy took the night of the accident foreshadow the deaths of the survivors is when Wendy sees a photo she took of Jason with the roller coaster in the background.

In an alternate version of Final Destination 3, Jason survives the derailment after Wendy receives an alternate premonition.

Julie Christensen

 Portrayed by: Amanda Crew
 Appeared in: Final Destination 3, Final Destination 5
 Status: Unknown

Julie Christensen is one of the survivors of the Devil's Flight roller coaster.

Julie is Wendy Christensen's younger sister, who attends McKinley High School's grad night at the amusement park, despite being a junior. Unbeknownst to Wendy, she and her friend Perry Malinowski board the Devil's Flight roller coaster and even sit right in front of Wendy and Kevin Fischer. In Wendy's premonition, the two die alongside Ian McKinley and Erin Ulmer when the ride gets stuck upside down on a vertical loop. When Wendy panics, Julie and Perry leave the ride, but go unnoticed due to all the commotion. Later, while Julie is at the town's Tricentennial Fair with her friends, Wendy realizes that she was also on the ride, after she notices a photo of an unidentifiable passenger wearing Julie's charm bracelet. She rushes to save Julie, while Kevin tries to warn her. Meanwhile, two pranksters scare a horse tied to a post with firecrackers, causing it to run through the fair in a panic. The rope tied to the horse wraps around Julie's neck and she is dragged through the fair, but Kevin manages to cut the rope before she is impaled by a harrow, and Death skips her. Five months later, Julie coincidentally crosses paths with Wendy and Kevin on a subway. Wendy has a premonition that the train will derail, and Julie will be obliterated by a stray wheel. When she warns them they attempt to stop the train, and the screen then cuts to black, followed by the sound of screeching metal, leaving Julie's fate unknown.

Julie is seen again in a montage at the end of Final Destination 5.

Kevin Fischer
 Portrayed by: Ryan Merriman
 Appeared in: Final Destination 3, Final Destination 5
 Status: Unknown

Kevin Fischer is one of the survivors of the Devil's Flight roller coaster.

Kevin is a senior at McKinley High School who attends grad night at the amusement park with his girlfriend Carrie Dreyer, best friend Jason Wise, and Jason's girlfriend Wendy Christensen. As they board the Devil's Flight roller coaster, Wendy has a premonition that the ride will crash. In her premonition, Kevin is bisected by a metal pipe. When she panics, Kevin ends up getting into a fight with Lewis Romero and is kicked off the ride, which crashes shortly after. Despite his grief over Carrie's death, Kevin is fascinated by the paranormal phenomenon that Wendy experienced, and researches premonitions which lead him to learn of the Flight 180 disaster and the deaths of the survivors. He warns Wendy that Death is still after them and she initially dismisses his findings; but when the other survivors start to die, they work together to save those who remain. Kevin is nearly killed at the McKinley Tricentennial celebration when a malfunctioning barbecue grill explodes in his face, but Wendy pulls him back at the last second and Death skips him. Five months later, Kevin crosses paths with Wendy and her sister Julie Christensen on a subway train. Wendy has another premonition that the train will crash, and Kevin will be ground between the train and the tunnel wall after falling out the window. After this, Kevin sees Wendy's expression and realizes what is going to happen. The three attempt to stop the train, with Kevin attempting to use the emergency brake, and the screen cuts to black, followed by the sound of screeching metal, leaving his fate unknown.

Kevin is seen again in a montage at the end of Final Destination 5.

In an extended scene, it is revealed that Kevin aims for a career in law enforcement, and works as a security guard to earn credits for the police academy he enrolled in. Thus, this explains Kevin's needs to save the survivors because he has a drive to serve and protect.

Lewis Romero
 Portrayed by: Texas Battle
 Appeared in: Final Destination 3, The Final Destination, Final Destination 5
 Status: Deceased

Lewis Romero is one of the survivors of the Devil's Flight roller coaster. He is the fourth survivor to die.

Lewis is an arrogant and competitive athlete and a McKinley High School graduate, who believes his life will be a series of wins and triumphs without losses. He previously auditioned to play for the college football team, the Bruins, from University of California, Los Angeles. Lewis is rejected by them but is accepted by another, yet uncelebrated team, the Sultans; he then shares his teammates' hatred against the Bruins since. During a high school grad night, Lewis visits a local amusement park with his graduating class, and boards the Devils's Flight roller coaster. Before the ride starts, Wendy Christensen has a premonition that the ride will crash. In Wendy's premonition, Lewis' spine is snapped by the tracks when he falls out of his seat. When Wendy panics, Lewis begins to mock her, believing that she is making the whole thing up in order to get attention. He gets into a fight with Kevin Fischer and they are kicked off the ride, which crashes moments later as Wendy predicted. When the survivors begin to die, Wendy and Kevin visit Lewis at a gym to warn him that he is next on Death's list, but he rudely disregards their warning. While Lewis works out at a Bowflex machine, one of the weightlifters knocks out a bear statue's claw, which hits another weightlifter in the eye, causing him to drop the weights, which knocks down two displayed swords that swing down and cut the wires to the weights at the Bowflex machine. When Lewis lifts the machine one more time, the weights fall and crush his head.

In an alternate version of the scene, when Wendy takes another look at Lewis' picture, his death occurs much earlier as soon as Wendy and Kevin visit the gym. Both his premonition death and actual death are seen in x-ray format during the opening credits of The Final Destination, and he is seen again in a montage at the end of Final Destination 5.

Perry Malinowski
 Portrayed by: Maggie Ma
 Appeared in: Final Destination 3, The Final Destination, Final Destination 5
 Status: Deceased

Perry Malinowski is one of the survivors of the Devil's Flight roller coaster. She is the sixth survivor to die.

Perry visits the amusement park with her friends Julie Christensen and Amber Regan for McKinley High School's grad night. Unbeknownst to Wendy Christensen she boards the Devil's Flight roller coaster with Julie. In Wendy's premonition, Perry falls to her death when the ride gets stuck on a loop. She and Julie quickly leave the ride before it crashes, but go unnoticed due to all of the commotion. Wendy later learns that Julie was also on the ride and rushes to McKinley's Tricentennial Fair to save her. Wendy arrives just as a frightened horse starts dragging Julie through the fair, but Kevin Fischer saves Julie before she is impaled by a harrow. The guards try to settle the horse down and tie it to a flagpole. When Perry and Amber arrive to console Julie, Wendy begs Julie to tell her who was sitting next to her on the ride, as that person will be next on Death's list. Perry realizes that she will be next, just as the horse loses control and breaks the flagpole, which is sent flying in their direction. As Perry stands up, the flagpole impales her through the chest, killing her.

Perry's death is seen in x-ray format during the opening credits of The Final Destination, and again in a montage at the end of Final Destination 5.

Wendy Christensen

 Portrayed by: Mary Elizabeth Winstead
 Appeared in: Final Destination 3, Final Destination 5
 Status: Unknown

Wendy Christensen is the protagonist and visionary of Final Destination 3. She is one of the survivors of the Devil's Flight roller coaster.

Wendy is a senior and school photographer at McKinley High School, who visits the amusement park for grad night with her boyfriend Jason Wise, best friend Carrie Dreyer, and Carrie's boyfriend Kevin Fischer. Wendy is considered a control freak among her peers, and her anxiety is evident when they decide to ride the roller coaster Devil's Flight. Before the ride starts, Wendy has a vision that it will crash, killing everyone on it. When she panics, Wendy is escorted off the ride, along with nine others, and witnesses the ride crash shortly after, killing the remaining passengers, including Jason and Carrie, leaving Wendy devastated. After learning about what happened to the Flight 180 and Route 23 survivors, she realizes that Death is still after them, and sets out with Kevin to save the others using photos she took the night of the accident, which provide clues as to how the next person will die. Most of her attempts are futile, with the exception of Ian McKinley, her younger sister Julie Christensen, and Kevin. Blaming her for his girlfriend Erin Ulmer's death, Ian confronts Wendy at the town's Tricentennial Fair. Death skips Wendy after she dodges a set of fireworks and Ian is crushed by a nearby cherry picker. This leads Wendy to believe that since they have all been skipped they are now safe from Death. Five months later, Wendy crosses paths with Kevin and Julie on a subway train and has another premonition that the train will crash. Wendy survives the crash but is hit by another train. As they attempt to stop the train, the screen cuts to black followed by the sound of screeching metal.

Wendy is seen again in a montage at the end of Final Destination 5.

The Final Destination

Andy Kewzer
 Portrayed by: Andrew Fiscella
 Appeared in: The Final Destination, Final Destination 5
 Status: Deceased

Andrew "Andy" Kewzer is one of the survivors of the McKinley Speedway crash. He is the third survivor to die.

Andy is a mechanic who visits the McKinley Speedway with his girlfriend Nadia Monroy. In Nick O'Bannon's premonition, Andy rushes to reach the exit after Nadia is decapitated by a tire, but is killed when he trips and a sharp plank impales the back of his head and out of his mouth. When Nick panics and attempts to escape, he accidentally bumps into Andy, and he and Nadia follow him out of the stadium. Moments later Nadia is obliterated by a stray tire, leaving Andy devastated. When the survivors start to die, Nick, George Lanter, and Lori Milligan visit Andy at the mechanic shop to warn him that he is next on Death's list, but he does not believe them. After a truck nearly crushes him into a cross-hatched fence, a  tank explodes and flies into Andy, knocking him into the fence which slices his body into pieces.

Andy is seen again in a montage at the end of Final Destination 5.

Carter Daniels
 Portrayed by: Justin Welborn
 Appeared in: The Final Destination, Final Destination 5
 Status: Deceased

Carter Daniels is one of the survivors of the McKinley Speedway crash. He is the first survivor to die.

Carter is a neo-Nazi (evinced by the swastika tattooed on his left arm) redneck who visits the McKinley Speedway with his wife Cynthia Daniels, who is as intolerant as her husband. In Nick O'Bannon's premonition, the couple is killed when debris flies into the stadium and bisects them. When Nick panics and attempts to escape, he accidentally bumps into Carter on his way out. Carter follows him out of the stadium, and orders Cynthia to stay behind. When the accident occurs moments later, security guard George Lanter refuses to let him go back for his wife, who dies in the disaster. Carter, devastated, blames George for his wife's death, in addition to already hating him for being African-American. He is also hostile towards Nick, considering him a freak because of his premonition. While attempting to set a giant cross on fire on George's front lawn, a horseshoe hanging from his tow truck's rear view mirror falls onto the gear shift and the truck begins to roll away. Carter attempts to stop his truck, but a loose towing cable wraps around his ankle and drags him down the street. Gas spills out of the truck and the cable sparks, lighting Carter on fire, before the truck finally explodes. Carter is blown to pieces, and his severed head lands on George's lawn.

Carter is seen again in a montage at the end of Final Destination 5.

Cynthia Daniels
 Portrayed by: Lara Grice
 Appeared in: The Final Destination, Final Destination 5
 Status: Deceased

Cynthia Daniels is the wife of Carter Daniels and a casualty in the McKinley Speedway crash.

Cynthia visits the McKinley Speedway with her husband Carter. Like her husband, Cynthia is a racist herself as she disregarded security guard George Lanter with her spouse prior to the speedway collisions. In Nick O'Bannon's premonition, the couple is killed when debris flies into the stadium and bisects them. When Nick panics and attempts to leave the stadium he accidentally bumps into Carter. Carter follows Nick out of the stadium, and instructs Cynthia to stay behind. When the accident occurs moments later, George refuses to let Carter go back for her, and she is killed in the accident. Her death devastates Carter, and causes him to resent George, whom he blames for his wife's death.

Cynthia is seen again in a montage at the end of Final Destination 5.

George Lanter
 Portrayed by: Mykelti Williamson
 Appeared in: The Final Destination, Final Destination 5
 Status: Deceased

George Lanter is one of the survivors of the McKinley Speedway crash. He is the sixth survivor to die.

George is a security guard working the stands at the McKinley Speedway. He is a widower and recovering alcoholic who grieves over the deaths of his wife and daughter, and inadvertently responsible for the accident that killed them because he was driving under the influence of alcohol at the time. In Nick O'Bannon's premonition, George and Lori Milligan are incinerated by a fire caused by an exploding motor engine. When Nick panics, George escorts him out and witnesses the accident occur moments later. He believes Nick and Lori when they warn him that Death is still after them, and attempts to help them save the other survivors. After he and Lori save Janet Cunningham from a malfunctioning car wash, George realizes that he is next on Death's list. He attempts to take his own life, but his multiple failed attempts lead the trio to believe that saving Janet ruined Death's plan. Nick later realizes that Jonathan Groves was actually next, and they rush to the hospital to save him, but they arrive too late. As they leave, George is struck and killed by a speeding ambulance.

George's death is seen again in a montage at the end of Final Destination 5.

Hunt Wynorski

 Portrayed by: Nick Zano
 Appeared in: The Final Destination, Final Destination 5
 Status: Deceased

Hunt Wynorski is Nick O'Bannon's best friend, and one of the survivors of the McKinley Speedway crash. He is the fourth survivor to die.

Hunt is a college student who visits the McKinley Speedway for a study break, with his best friend Nick, Nick's girlfriend Lori Milligan, and his ex-girlfriend Janet Cunningham. In Nick's premonition, Hunt and Janet are both crushed by the concrete stands when the stadium collapses. When Nick panics, Hunt follows him out of the stadium, and witnesses the accident occur moments later. He is sarcastic and skeptical when Nick and Lori later try to warn him that Death is still after them. After receiving another vision, Nick attempts to warn Hunt to stay away from water. While at a country club pool, a kid squirts Hunt with a water gun, damaging his phone. Hunt takes the gun and places it on the pool's control box, but the gun falls onto a lever, causing the pool to start draining. While he relaxes by the pool, someone in the adjacent field hits a golf ball, which hits Hunt. He drops his lucky coin, which rolls into the pool and is sucked down the drain. When Hunt dives in the pool to retrieve it, he is sucked in by the drain as well. Unable to move, Hunt lies under water trying to scream for help as the draining pressure increases. The drain eventually sucks his organs out through his anus, which are then shot out through a poolside pump, along with his lucky coin.

Hunt's death is seen again in a montage at the end of Final Destination 5.

Janet Cunningham
 Portrayed by: Haley Webb
 Appeared in: The Final Destination, Final Destination 5
 Status: Deceased

Janet Cunningham is Lori Milligan's best friend, and one of the survivors of the McKinley Speedway crash. She is the seventh survivor to die.

Janet is a college student, who is forced to go to the race track with her best friend Lori, Lori's boyfriend Nick O'Bannon, and her ex-boyfriend Hunt Wynorski, instead of going to the movies like she wanted. In Nick's premonition, she and Hunt are both crushed under concrete stands when the stadium collapses. When Nick panics, she follows him out of the stadium before the accident occurs. Afterwards, the survivors begin to die one by one in a series of freak accidents. Nick and Lori attempt to warn Janet that Death is still after them, but she refuses to believe them. She is nearly killed at a car wash, but Lori and George Lanter arrive in time to save her, which leads them to believe that they have cheated Death's plan. She and Lori later visit a mall cinema, which would have exploded, sending shrapnel into Janet's face, but Nick manages to stop the explosion before it occurs, leading them to believe that they have cheated Death again. Two weeks later, while at a cafe with Janet and Lori, Nick realizes that the mall disaster vision was only a feint meant to lead them to where they needed to be for Death to strike. As he relays this information to Janet and Lori, a large truck crashes into the coffee shop killing all three of them; Janet's spine is crushed under the tires.

Janet is seen again in a montage at the end of Final Destination 5.

Jonathan Groves
 Portrayed by: Jackson Walker
 Appeared in: The Final Destination
 Status: Deceased

Jonathan Groves is one of the survivors of the McKinley Speedway crash. He is the fifth survivor to die.

Jonathan is a cowboy who visits the McKinley Speedway. In Nick O'Bannon's premonition, Nick asks him to move so Lori Milligan can see just moments before the car crash that causes the speedway to collapse, and Jonathan is killed by a car that flies into the stadium. Nick does not remember Jonathan at first because he never left the stadium with the other survivors, but later sees on a news report that he was injured from the accident and sent to the hospital. It is revealed that because Nick left the stadium before asking him to move, like he did in his premonition, he inadvertently saved Jonathan's life, thus putting him on Death's list. Nick and George Lanter rush to save him at the hospital, but they arrive too late and he is crushed by an overflowing bathtub that falls through the floor above him.

Lori Milligan
 Portrayed by: Shantel VanSanten
 Appeared in: The Final Destination
 Status: Deceased

Lori Milligan is the girlfriend of Nick O'Bannon, and one of the survivors of the McKinley speedway crash. She is the eighth survivor to die.

Lori is a college student who visits the McKinley Speedway for a study break with Nick, her best friend Janet Cunningham, and Hunt Wynorski. In Nick's premonition, Lori is killed when an engine explodes and engulfs her in flames. When Nick panics she follows him out of the stadium and witnesses the accident occur moments later. When the survivors begin to die one by one in a series of bizarre accidents, she and Nick attempt to save those who remain. Lori and George Lanter manage to save Janet, leading them to believe that they have cheated Death. However, while visiting a mall cinema with Janet, Lori begins to see omens as well and suspects they are still in danger. Nick has another premonition of a disastrous mall explosion in which Lori would have been killed after falling into an open escalator engine, but he manages to arrive in time to stop the explosion before it occurs, leading them to believe they have cheated Death. Two weeks later, while at a cafe with Lori and Janet, Nick realizes the mall disaster vision was only a feint meant to lead them to where they needed to be for Death to strike. As he relays this information to Lori and Janet, a truck crashes through the window, and kills all three of them; Lori's neck is snapped by the impact and she is decapitated.

Nadia Monroy
 Portrayed by: Stephanie Honoré
 Appeared in: The Final Destination, Final Destination 5
 Status: Deceased

Nadia Monroy is the girlfriend of Andy Kewzer and a casualty in the McKinley Speedway crash.

Nadia visits the McKinley Speedway with her boyfriend Andy. In Nick O'Bannon's premonition, Nadia is killed when a stray tire flies into the stadium and decapitates her. When Nick panics and attempts to escape, he accidentally bumps into Andy, who angrily follows him out of the stadium with Nadia in tow. As she reprimands the group for their actions the accident occurs and a stray tire flies out of the stadium and obliterates her, severing her head and left arm, similar to her death in Nick's premonition.

Nadia's death is seen again in a montage at the end of Final Destination 5.

Nick O'Bannon
 Portrayed by: Bobby Campo
 Appeared in: The Final Destination, Final Destination 5
 Status: Deceased

Nicholas "Nick" O'Bannon is the protagonist and visionary of The Final Destination. He is one of the survivors of the McKinley Speedway crash, and is the ninth and final survivor to die.

Nick is a college student who visits the McKinley Speedway for a study break with his girlfriend Lori Milligan and their friends, Hunt Wynorski and Janet Cunningham. While watching the race, Nick has a premonition that a massive crash will send debris into the stands, causing the stadium to collapse on the guests. In his premonition, Nick is killed when the force from an exploding motor engine pushes him into a metal pipe. He urges his friends to leave the speedway, and a fight breaks out between Nick and several other spectators, who follow him out of the stadium before the accident occurs. When the survivors begin to die one by one in a series of freak accidents, he and Lori attempt to save those who remain using his visions, which provide clues as to how the next person will die. Nick later has a vision of a disastrous mall fire that would have killed Lori and Janet, but he manages to stop it before it occurs, leading them to believe that they have cheated Death. Two weeks later, while at a cafe with Lori and Janet, Nick realizes that the mall disaster vision was only a feint meant to lead them to where they needed to be for Death to strike. As he realizes this, a truck smashes through the window, killing all three of them; Nick is thrown into a wall, and the impact smashes his head and dislocates his jaw.

Nick is seen again in a montage at the end of Final Destination 5.

Samantha Lane
 Portrayed by: Krista Allen
 Appeared in: The Final Destination, Final Destination 5
 Status: Deceased

Samantha "Sam" Lane is one of the survivors of the McKinley Speedway crash. She is the second survivor to die.

Samantha visits the McKinley Speedway with her husband and two sons. In Nick O'Bannon's premonition, Samantha is trampled by fleeing spectators, before being crushed by a car engine that flies into the stadium. After Nick panics, she and her husband follow their sons out of the speedway and witness the accident occur moments later. They thank Nick during a candlelight vigil held at the stadium the following night. Samantha later visits a beauty salon, where a series of harrowing accidents occur. While she is leaving, a rock, which was tossed into the path of a lawn mower by one of her sons, is shot through her eye, killing her.

Samantha's death is seen again in a montage at the end of Final Destination 5.

Final Destination 5

Candice Hooper
 Portrayed by: Ellen Wroe
 Appeared in: Final Destination 5
 Status: Deceased

Candice Hooper is one of the survivors of the North Bay bridge. She is the first survivor to die.

Candice is the girlfriend of Peter Friedkin and an intern at Presage Paper. She is also a college student and varsity gymnast. She and her co-workers are on their way to a corporate retreat when Sam Lawton has a premonition that the bridge they are crossing will collapse. In Sam's premonition, Candice would have been killed after falling off the bridge and being impaled by a sail boat mast. Candice follows Peter off the bus, and witnesses the bridge collapse moments later. She later attends a gymnastics meet with Peter where she is stalked by Death. When another woman steps on an upright screw that fell onto the balance beams, she falls off, knocking a big bowl of powder into a fan. The dust blinds Candice, who falls off the uneven bars, and her body folds in half backwards, snapping her spine and killing her.

Dennis Lapman
 Portrayed by: David Koechner
 Appeared in: Final Destination 5
 Status: Deceased

Dennis Lapman is one of the survivors of the North Bay bridge. He is the fourth survivor to die.

Dennis is the manager of Presage Paper. He and his employees are on their way to a corporate retreat when Sam Lawton has a premonition that the bridge they are crossing will collapse. In Sam's premonition, Dennis would have been burned by hot asphalt spilled from a tanker before falling off the bridge to his death. When Sam panics, Dennis follows him off the bus and watches the bridge collapse shortly after. Dennis does not take Peter Friedkin seriously when he tries to warn him that Death is still after them. Dennis later arrives to confront the survivors about Roy Carson's death when he is killed in a warehouse accident, and is himself killed when a wrench launched by a belt sander is hurled at his face as the other survivors and factory workers watch in horror.

Isaac Palmer
 Portrayed by: P. J. Byrne
 Appeared in: Final Destination 5
 Status: Deceased

Isaac Palmer is one of the survivors of the North Bay bridge. He is the second survivor to die.

Isaac is an office worker at Presage Paper and a perverse womanizer. He and his co-workers are on their way to a corporate retreat when Sam Lawton has a premonition that the bridge they are crossing will collapse. In Sam's premonition, Isaac would have been trapped inside the bus and killed when it fell into the river. When Sam panics, a confused Isaac follows him off the bus, and witnesses the bridge collapse moments later. Afterwards, while stealing items from his deceased co-workers' desks, Isaac finds a coupon for an acupuncture session at a Chinese spa. After the masseuse finishes the acupuncture session she leaves him on the table. Shortly after she leaves, a fire erupts, caused by burning incense falling onto towels. When Isaac attempts to escape, the legs on the table break, having been weakened by an aggressive massage he received earlier, and he falls face down onto the ground, pushing the needles deep into his skin. The fire is worsened when a falling candle, knocked off a shelf by his vibrating phone, ignites spilled alcohol (used to sterilise the needles). Isaac narrowly avoids the growing fire, but a few seconds later, a shelf holding a heavy Buddha statue breaks, causing the statue to fall and crush his head.

Agent Jim Block
 Portrayed by: Courtney B. Vance
 Appeared in: Final Destination 5
 Status: Deceased

Agent Jim Block is an FBI agent investigating the North Bay bridge collapse. He probes Sam Lawton, believing that he is responsible for the accident. Agent Block is later shot and killed by Peter Friedkin while attempting to stop him from killing Molly Harper, and Peter claims his remaining lifespan.

Molly Harper

 Portrayed by: Emma Bell
 Appeared in: Final Destination 5
 Status: Deceased

Molly Harper is one of the survivors of the North Bay bridge. She is the sixth survivor to die.

Molly is an office worker at Presage Paper, who breaks up with Sam Lawton because she does not want to hold him back from pursuing his dream of being a chef in Paris. She is on her way to a corporate retreat when Sam has a premonition that the bridge they are crossing will collapse, killing everyone on it except for Molly, whom Sam would have gotten across the bridge safely. Sam panics and convinces Molly as well as a few of his co-workers to leave the bridge before it collapses. Molly and Sam rekindle their relationship, and after learning that Death is still after them, they attempt to save the survivors. Later, Peter Friedkin attempts to kill Molly, but Sam intervenes at the last second, adding her to Death's list. Two weeks later, she and Sam board Flight 180 to Paris, and the fuselage is torn open by debris when one of the plane's engines explodes. Despite Sam's efforts to pull Molly back into the plane, she is blown out and bisected by the left tailplane.

Nathan Sears
 Portrayed by: Arlen Escarpeta
 Appeared in: Final Destination 5
 Status: Deceased

Nathan "Nate" Sears is one of the survivors of the North Bay bridge. He is the eighth and final survivor to die.

Nathan is a supervisor at Presage Paper who is on his way to a corporate retreat when his friend Sam Lawton has a premonition that the bridge they are crossing will collapse. In Sam's premonition, Nathan would have been obliterated by a swinging support cable. When Sam panics, Nathan follows him off the bridge before it collapses. Nathan is initially skeptical, but believes that he has cheated Death when he accidentally kills his antagonistic co-worker Roy Carson in a warehouse accident. At the end of the film, Nathan learns from a co-worker that Roy had a brain aneurysm that could have killed him at any moment. A few seconds later, Nathan is killed when the landing gear from Flight 180 crashes through the building and crushes him.

Olivia Castle

 Portrayed by: Jacqueline MacInnes Wood
 Appeared in: Final Destination 5
 Status: Deceased

Olivia Castle is one of the survivors of the North Bay bridge. She is the third survivor to die.

Olivia is the rival of Candice Hooper and an office worker at Presage Paper. She and her co-workers are on their way to a corporate retreat when Sam Lawton has a premonition that the bridge they are crossing will collapse. In Sam's premonition, Olivia would have been crushed by a car after falling into the river. She follows Sam off the bus and witnesses the bridge collapse moments later. A few days later, she goes to a LASIK appointment to improve her myopic vision. When the doctor leaves to get her files, the machine malfunctions, discharging a powerful laser beam that sears her eye and hand. She manages to free herself, but after Sam, Molly Harper, and the doctor arrive, she trips on the dislodged eye of a stuffed teddy bear and falls out of the window, landing on a car below. After she dies, her eye rolls into the middle of the street and is run over by a car.

Peter Friedkin
 Portrayed by: Miles Fisher
 Appeared in: Final Destination 5
 Status: Deceased

Peter Friedkin is one of the survivors of the North Bay bridge. He is the fifth survivor to die.

Peter is Candice Hooper's boyfriend and Sam Lawton's best friend. He is also the middle manager at Presage Paper. While on their way to a corporate retreat, Sam warns him that the bridge they are crossing will collapse. In Sam's premonition, Peter would have been impaled by metal rods before falling onto a concrete slab below. When Sam flees the bus, Peter is instructed by his boss, Dennis Lapman, to go after him, and he witnesses the bridge collapse shortly after. He becomes paranoid after witnessing Candice's death, and learns from William Bludworth that he can cheat Death by taking someone else's life. He eventually decides to take Molly Harper's life, but while pursuing her he kills Agent Jim Block instead. He continues to pursue Molly to eliminate any witnesses, but is killed by Sam who stabs him in the back with a cooking skewer, leading Sam to believe he has claimed Block's life.

Roy Carson
 Portrayed by: Brent Stait
 Appeared in: Final Destination 5
 Status: Deceased

Roy Carson is a factory worker at Presage Paper, and Nathan Sears' arch rival. He is accidentally killed by Nathan when he pushes him in front of a construction hook that falls through the floor and impales him through the chin, and Nathan claims his remaining lifespan. However, this proves to be insufficient, as Nathan learns that Roy had a brain aneurysm that would inevitably have killed him anyway, just before he is killed by a falling piece of wreckage from Volée Airlines Flight 180.

Sam Lawton

 Portrayed by: Nicholas D'Agosto
 Appeared in: Final Destination 5
 Status: Deceased

Samuel "Sam" Lawton is the protagonist and visionary of Final Destination 5. He is one of the survivors of the North Bay bridge, and the seventh survivor to die.

Sam is an office worker at Presage Paper and a trainee chef who has dreams of going to Paris to be an apprentice for his mentor. While on his way to a corporate retreat, Sam has a premonition that the North Bay bridge will collapse, and manages to convince his co-workers to leave the bus before the accident occurs. He later learns that Death is still after them, and he and his ex-girlfriend Molly Harper attempt to save the remaining survivors. When Peter Friedkin tries to kill Molly, Sam stops him by stabbing him in the back with a large skewer, and he assumes that he has taken Agent Jim Block's life (whom Peter killed). Two weeks later, he and Molly board a plane to Paris which is revealed to be Flight 180, and he is incinerated with the other passengers when the plane explodes in midair.

References

 
Final Destination